Bingen is the surname of:

 Haakon Bingen (1918–2002), Norwegian economist and civil servant 
 Jacques Bingen (1908–1944), World War II French Resistance member
 Jean Bingen (1920–2012), Belgian papyrologist and epigrapher 
 Kari Bingen, 21st century American government official

See also
Bingen (disambiguation)

German-language surnames